Face the Music is an American television game show that aired daily in syndication from January 14, 1980, to September 1981. The show was hosted by actor Ron Ely, with Dave Williams as announcer for the first season and John Harlan for the second with Art James as a substitute. The Tommy Oliver Orchestra, with Lisa Donovan as vocalist, was also featured. Face the Music was produced and distributed by Sandy Frank Productions.

The basic premise of Face the Music was a musical guessing game in the same vein as Name That Tune, which Frank was also distributing when Face the Music premiered and for whom Oliver had been the orchestra director during the mid-1970s. The twist, however, was that in addition to identifying the songs that the orchestra played, the contestants had to link the song titles to famous people, places, and things.

Gameplay
On each episode three new contestants compete for the right to face a returning champion in the end game. The first part of the game was played in three rounds.

Main game

Round 1
The contestants were shown six pictures, mostly faces of famous people, although places and even fictional characters were shown at times. The band played a song, and the first contestant to buzz-in, give its title, and identify the face associated with it scored 10 points. The idea was to link the title with something closely linked to the famous face, such as "Happy Talk" for talk show host Johnny Carson. In another example, an actor (such as Rob Reiner or Carroll O'Connor) who appeared on a certain television series would be linked to the theme song from that series (in this case, All in the Family). A third example would be a song that the famous face performed, such as "Ready to Take a Chance Again" by Barry Manilow.

An incorrect guess carried no point penalty. However, a contestant who failed to correctly identify a song after buzzing-in was locked out of the next one. The round ended after one song had been played for each of the six famous faces.

Round 2
In the second round, each song served as a clue to the identity of a subject. The subject category was given to the contestants (person, place, thing, fictional character, etc.), after which the band (or on some occasions, Donovan) played/sung the first song. A contestant buzzed-in and attempted to correctly name the song. Doing so gave the contestant the opportunity to name the subject to which the song applied. If the contestant was wrong or did not guess the subject, another song was played and the process repeated. As in round 1, if the contestant failed to identify the correct song, they would be locked out of the next tune. Up to four musical clues were played for each subject, and correctly identifying the subject earned the contestant 20 points.

For example, in the category of "fictional character", the songs "(I Can't Get No) Satisfaction", "The Teddy Bears' Picnic", "Go Away Little Girl", and "Band of Gold" all pertained to Goldilocks from "The Story of the Three Bears".

The round was played until time was called, with the two highest-scoring players advancing to the third round.

In the event of a tie for second place, a shortened version of the first round was played. Three pictures were shown to the tied contestants, after which a song played. The first contestant to name the song and identify the picture to which it applied advanced to round three. If all three contestants were tied, a second song was played to determine the second contestant who advanced.

Round 3
In Round 3, the remaining two contestants again tried to guess subjects through use of song titles. This time, if a contestant did not correctly identify a song title the opposing player was given the chance to do so. Identifying the subject in this round was worth 30 points.

The player in the lead when time was called advanced to the Championship Round to face the champion while the other player won a consolation prize for advancing to the third round. As before, a tie was broken with a shortened version of the first round.

Championship round
In the championship round, the reigning champion and the surviving contestant competed to identify a famous person using song titles and a series of six photographs of him/her from infancy through adulthood. The first one to do this would win the championship and the right to return on the next show. Beginning in the second season, the contestants were told whether or not the subject was a woman or a man. 

The champion and challenger would be shown the photographs one at a time with an accompanying song. For the first picture and musical clue only, whoever buzzed in and correctly identified the song title was given ten seconds to study the picture before offering a guess. If the contestant identified the subject, he/she was rewarded with a $10,000 prize. Originally, champions won a prize package totaling that amount, but after two weeks this was changed to offering $10,000 in cash. 

If the subject was not guessed on the first try, play continued and the contestant who eventually gave the correct answer to win the game would receive a prize package. The prize package started at $5,000 with the second picture/song combination and decreased by $1,000 for each subsequent turn, with the sixth and final combination being worth $1,000 in prizes. 

If neither contestant was able to identify the subject after all six photographs had been revealed, the tiebreaker from the second and third rounds was played to determine the champion. The first contestant to correctly identify the song title and the celebrity associated with it won the $1,000 prize package. 

In the first season, champions stayed on for up to ten games or until defeated. In the second season, champions stayed on until defeated, regardless of the number of wins. A champion was rewarded with a new automobile for winning five consecutive games, with cars provided by Datsun in season one and Chrysler Corporation in season two. If any champion managed to reach ten wins, he/she would win a trip for two around the world during the first season and a travel trailer for season two.

Episode status
Face the Music still exists in its entirety and has been previously rerun on CBN (July 2, 1984, to September 27, 1985, and January 6 to August 29, 1986), USA Network (January 2 to September 8, 1989, and March 26 to September 14, 1990), and The Family Channel (January 2 to September 29, 1995)

Band members

Face the Music featured band members who also appeared on another show by Sandy Frank Productions, Name That Tune. The band members included pianist Michel Rubini, drummer Evan Diner, guitarists Tommy Tedesco and brothers Tom and John Morell, sax player Fred Selden, bass player Lyle Ritz, and trombonists Lew McCreary and Gil Falco. Tommy Oliver played electric piano in addition to conducting the group.

References

External links
 Sandy Frank Entertainment (containing clips of a typical episode)
 Official website of vocalist Lisa Donovan
 Face the Music on IMDb

Musical game shows
First-run syndicated television programs in the United States
1980s American game shows
1980 American television series debuts
1981 American television series endings